James Smith (1889 – 8 October 1918) was an English professional footballer who scored 49 goals from 90 appearances in the Football League playing as a centre forward for Bradford (Park Avenue).

Smith was born in Stafford, Staffordshire. He was a prolific scorer in local football in the Hanley area, but began his professional career with Southern League club Brighton & Hove Albion in January 1911. He was the club's top scorer in the 1911–12 season with 27 goals in all competitions. In November 1912, he moved into the Football League, joining Bradford for the substantial fee of £735 plus inside forward Bobby Simpson. Smith played 90 League games for Bradford, scoring at better than a goal every two games and helping them earn promotion to the First Division in 1914, before the First World War interrupted his career.

He served as a gunner in the Royal Field Artillery, and was killed in action on the Western Front in 1918, a few weeks before he was due to get married. He is buried in the British Cemetery at Ramicourt, Aisne, France.

References

1889 births
Date of birth missing
1918 deaths
Sportspeople from Stafford
English footballers
Association football forwards
Brighton & Hove Albion F.C. players
Bradford (Park Avenue) A.F.C. players
Southern Football League players
English Football League players
British Army personnel of World War I
Royal Field Artillery soldiers
British military personnel killed in World War I
Military personnel from Staffordshire
Burials in Hauts-de-France